The WorldCom scandal was a major accounting scandal that came into light in the summer of 2002 at WorldCom, the USA's second-largest long-distance telephone company at the time. From 1999 to 2002, senior executives at WorldCom led by founder and CEO Bernard Ebbers orchestrated a scheme to inflate earnings in order to maintain WorldCom's stock price.
The fraud was uncovered in June 2002 when the company's internal audit unit, led by unit vice president Cynthia Cooper, discovered over $3.8 billion of fraudulent balance sheet entries. Eventually, WorldCom was forced to admit that it had overstated its assets by over $11 billion. At the time, it was the largest accounting fraud in American history.

Background
In December 2000, WorldCom financial analyst Kim Emigh was told to allocate labor for capital projects in WorldCom's network systems division as an expense rather than book it as a capital project. By Emigh's estimate, the order would have affected at least $35 million in capital spending. Believing that he was being asked to commit tax fraud, Emigh pressed his concerns up the chain of command, notifying an assistant to WorldCom chief operating officer Ron Beaumont. Within 24 hours, it was decided not to implement the directive. However, Emigh was reprimanded by his immediate superiors and subsequently laid off in March 2001.

Emigh, who was from the MCI half of the 1997 WorldCom/MCI merger, later told Fort Worth Weekly in May 2002 that he had expressed concerns about MCI's spending habits for years. He believed that things had been reined in somewhat after WorldCom took over, but he was still unnerved by vendors billing WorldCom for exorbitant amounts. The Fort Worth Weekly article was eventually read by Glyn Smith, an internal audit manager at WorldCom headquarters in Clinton, Mississippi. After examining it, he suggested to his boss, Cynthia Cooper, that she should start that year's scheduled capital expenditure audit a few months early. Cooper agreed, and the audit began in late May.

Prepaid capacity
During a meeting with the auditors, corporate finance director Sanjeev Sethi explained that differing amounts in two capital spending expenditures were related to "prepaid capacity," something Cooper had never heard of. When pressed for an explanation, Sethi claimed that he did not know what the term meant, despite his division approving capital spending requests. He referred the auditors to corporate controller David Myers. Cooper asked Glyn Smith for an auditor with technical skills in order to locate the entries in the accounting system. Smith returned with Eugene Morse, who had helped with some reports on the wireless allowance audit. Morse subsequently joined Cooper and other auditors in trying to figure out what prepaid capacity was.

Since Sethi did not provide enough information, Cooper went to the head of property at WorldCom, Mark Abide. Abide claimed that he was not familiar with prepaid capacity, even though he made multiple entries on it in the computerized accounting system. With no new information, she asked Abide to provide accounts he had booked the relevant entries to. He named the accounts of furniture, fixtures, and other, transmission equipment, and communications equipment.

With starting points in hand, Cooper told her "techie" Morse to peruse the accounting system and look for any references to prepaid capacity. He eventually was able to locate one and took this information to Cooper. Since this only represented one side of the entry, she asked him to trace it through the system. Morse took all he could find to Cooper. Unable to effectively put the entries in any sensible order, Cooper and her team tried to decipher them using basic T accounts. However, the amounts were bouncing between accounts in an unusual manner, resulting in a large round amount moving from WorldCom's income statement to its balance sheet. Not totally satisfied with the results, Cooper asked Morse to try and find another prepaid capacity entry that moved around in similar fashion. 

While continuing to search for more entries, Cooper began to get emails from David Myers questioning why she was looking into capital expenditures. He told her that she was wasting her time and tying up employees, like Sethi, who are needed for other projects. Despite this pushback, she told him that the employees he needed could report back to him when they finished her other projects. The next day, Cooper received another email from Myers, more direct and formal than the first one. It claimed the capital expenditure audit was a waste of time. This intrigued Cooper, so she decided not to reply and continue with her investigation. Meanwhile, Morse had begun the search for other entries, but pulled so much data that he frequently clogged up the accounting servers. Fearing that Sullivan or Myers would eventually be alerted to the increased server activity, Cooper decided that she and her team would begin working at night to avoid detection. Finally, on June 10, they found more entries about "prepaid capacity"; large amounts that had been transferred from the income statement to the balance sheet from the third quarter of 2001 to the first quarter of 2002.

Suspicions mount
Soon afterward, chief financial officer Scott Sullivan, Cooper's immediate supervisor, called Cooper in for a meeting about audit projects, and asked the internal audit team to walk him through recently completed audits. When Smith's turn came, Cooper asked about the prepaid capacity entries. Sullivan claimed that it referred to costs related to SONET rings and lines that were either not being used at all or were seeing low usage. He claimed those costs were being capitalized because the costs associated with line leases were fixed even as revenue dropped. He planned to take a restructuring charge in the second quarter of 2002, after which WorldCom would allocate these costs between restructuring charges and expenses. He asked Cooper to postpone the capital-expenditure audit until the third quarter, heightening Cooper's suspicions.

That night, Cooper and Smith called Max Bobbitt, a WorldCom board member and the chairman of the Audit Committee, to discuss their concerns. Bobbitt was concerned enough to tell Cooper to discuss the matter with Farrell Malone of KPMG, WorldCom's external auditor. KPMG had inherited the WorldCom account when it bought Arthur Andersen's Jackson practice in the wake of Andersen's indictment for its role in the accounting scandal at Enron. By this time, the internal audit team had found 28 prepaid capacity entries dating back to the second quarter of 2001. By their calculations, if not for those entries, WorldCom's $130 million profit in the first quarter of 2002 would have become a $395 million loss. Despite this, Bobbitt thought it was premature to discuss the matter with the Audit Committee at that point. He did, however, discuss the matter with Sullivan, and assured Cooper that he would have support for those entries by the following Monday.

Fraud revealed
Cooper decided not to wait to discuss the matter with Sullivan. She decided to ask the accountants who made those entries to provide support for them herself. She first asked Kenny Avery, who had been Andersen's lead partner on the WorldCom account before KPMG took over, if he knew about prepaid capacity. Avery had never heard of the term, and knew of nothing in Generally Accepted Accounting Principles (GAAP) that allowed for capitalizing line costs. Andersen, it turned out, had never tested WorldCom's capital expenditures for it.

Cooper and Smith then questioned Betty Vinson, the accounting director who made the entries. To their surprise, Vinson admitted she had made the entries without knowing what they were for or seeing support for them. She had done so at the direction of Myers and general accounting director Buford Yates. When Cooper and Smith spoke with Yates, he admitted that he did not know what prepaid capacity was. Yates also claimed that accountants reporting to him booked entries at Myers' direction.

Finally, the internal auditors spoke with Myers. He admitted that there was no support for the entries. In fact, they had been booked "based on what we thought the margins should be," and there were no accounting standards that supported them. He admitted that the entries should have never been made, but it was difficult to stop once they started. Although he was uncomfortable with the entries, he never thought that he would have to explain them to regulators. The following day, Farrell met with Sullivan and Myers and concluded that their rationale for the entries made sense "from a business perspective, but not an accounting perspective." In response, Sullivan, Myers, Yates, and Abide scrambled to find amounts that were expensed when they should have been capitalized in hopes of offsetting the prepaid capacity entries. They believed that the only other alternative was an earnings restatement.

Bobbitt finally called an Audit Committee meeting for June 20. By this time, Cooper's team had discovered over $3 billion in questionable transfers from line cost expense accounts to assets from 2001 to 2002. At the meeting, Farrell stated that there was nothing in GAAP that would allow those entries. Sullivan claimed that WorldCom had invested in expanding the telecom network from 1999 onward, but the anticipated expansion in customer usage never occurred. He argued that the entries were justified on the basis of the matching principle, which allowed costs to be booked as expenses so they align with any future benefit accrued from an asset. He also contended that since capital assets were worth less than what the books said they should be, he reiterated his proposal for a restructuring charge, or an "impairment charge," as he called it, for the second quarter of 2002. He claimed that Myers could provide support for the entries. The committee gave him until the following Monday to get support.

Over the weekend, Cooper and her team discovered several more suspicious "prepaid capacity" entries. All told, the internal audit unit had discovered a total of 49 prepaid capacity entries detailing $3.8 billion in transfers spread out across all of 2001 and the first quarter of 2002. Several of them were keyed in on explicit directions from Sullivan and Myers under the line "SS entry." While some of the suspicious entries were made by directors and managers, others were made by lower-level accountants who didn't understand the seriousness of what they were doing. While meeting with another accounting director, Troy Normand, they learned about more potentially illicit accounting. According to Normand, management had drawn down the company's cost reserves in portions of 2000 and 2001 to artificially reduce expenses.

At the same time, the Audit Committee asked KPMG to conduct its own review. KPMG discovered that Sullivan had moved system costs across a number of property accounts, allowing them to be booked as capital expenditures. The expenses were spread out so they weren't initially obvious. When KPMG asked Andersen's former WorldCom engagement team about the entries, the Andersen accountants said they would have never approved of the entries had they known about them. Sullivan was asked to present a written explanation for his actions by Monday.

At an Audit Committee meeting that Monday, Sullivan presented a white paper explaining his reasoning. The Audit Committee and KPMG were not persuaded. They concluded that the amounts were transferred with the sole purpose of meeting Wall Street targets, and the only acceptable remedy was to restate corporate earnings for all of 2001 and the first quarter of 2002. Andersen withdrew its audit opinion for 2001, and the board demanded Sullivan and Myers' resignations.

SEC begins investigation
On June 25, after the amount of the illicit entries was confirmed, the board accepted Myers' resignation and fired Sullivan when he refused to resign. On the same day, WorldCom executives briefed the SEC, revealing that it would have to restate its earnings for the previous five quarters. Later that day, WorldCom publicly admitted that it had overstated its income by over $3.8 billion over the previous five quarters. The disclosure came at a particularly bad time for WorldCom. Even before the scandal broke, its credit had been reduced to junk status, and its stock had lost over 94 percent of its value. It had been facing a separate SEC investigation into its accounting that had started earlier in the year, and was laboring under $30 billion in debt. Amid rumors of bankruptcy, WorldCom said it would lay off 17,000 employees. The company filed for Chapter 11 bankruptcy protection on Sunday, July 21st, 2002. 

The federal government had already begun an informal inquiry earlier in June, when Vinson, Yates, and Normand secretly met with SEC and Justice Department officials. The SEC filed civil fraud charges against WorldCom on June 26, speculating that WorldCom had engaged in a concerted effort to manipulate its earnings in order to meet Wall Street targets and support its stock price. Additionally, it claimed that the scheme had been "directed and approved by senior management", hinting that executives in higher positions than Sullivan and Myers had known about the scheme.

Trial
In 2005, a jury found Ebbers guilty of fraud, conspiracy, and filing false documents with regulators. He was subsequently sentenced to 25 years in prison. However he was released in December 2019 due to declining health. Ebbers died February 2, 2020.

Aftermath
The Sarbanes–Oxley Act is said to have passed due to scandals such as WorldCom and Enron.

WorldCom, by then renamed MCI, was acquired by Verizon Communications in January 2006.

References

2002 scandals
Accounting scandals
2000s economic history
2002 in economics
Corporate crime
Finance fraud